Pedro Miguel Eira Pereira (born 24 September 1994 in Pousa) is a Portuguese footballer who plays for Merelinense as a defender.

Football career
On 27 January 2014, Eira made his professional debut with Braga B in a 2013–14 Segunda Liga match against Feirense, when he replaced Chidi Osuchukwu in the 81st minute.

References

External links

Stats and profile at LPFP 

1994 births
People from Barcelos, Portugal
Living people
Portuguese footballers
Association football defenders
Liga Portugal 2 players
S.C. Braga B players
F.C. Tirsense players
C.D. Trofense players
Sport Benfica e Castelo Branco players
S.C. Olhanense players
AD Fafe players
S.C. Vila Real players
Merelinense F.C. players
Sportspeople from Braga District